Mitr, My Friend is a 2002 Indian English-language drama film directed by Revathi in her directorial debut, and written by V. Priya and Sudha Kongara Prasad. Set partly in India and the US, the film was also noted for having an all-woman crew. The movie won the Best English Film of the year award at the 49th National Film Awards. The movie also won Best Actress and Best Editor awards for Shobhana and Beena Paul respectively at the same function. Revathi received the "Special Jury Award: Silver Peacock" at the 33rd International Film Festival of India.

Plot

"Mitr, My Friend" is a film about the plight of women who sacrifice their life for the betterment of their family. It also describes the cultural differences experienced by a small town girl on moving to a transposed environment living.

The film opens with a typical South Indian wedding being performed between Lakshmi (Shobhana) and Prithvi (Nasir Abdullah). The marriage has been arranged by their parents in the usual Indian manner. Lakshmi is a typical South Indian girl from Chidambaram, Tamil Nadu; Prithvi is a software engineer working in California. After the wedding, they move to the USA where Lakshmi gradually tries to fit into her new surroundings. The marriage is a happy union: Prithvi works hard at work, Lakshmi manages the home, and they grow to love one other deeply. Within a year, they are blessed with a baby girl Divya (Preeti Vissa).

The film flashes forward 17 years. Divya is a typical adolescent: she goes to school, plays soccer, and occasionally attends parties (not always with her parents' knowledge or permission). Lakshmi does not take to the partying very well, and tensions rise between mother and daughter. Divya aspires independence, and expresses herself by sidelining Lakshmi; Lakshmi wants her to be responsible, and expresses this by checking up on Divya a bit too much for Divya to be comfortable. Prithvi understands both sides, and tries to cope with Divya's growing up, but not always with full cognizance of Lakshmi's feelings.

Things escalate one evening when Divya kisses her boyfriend Robbie outside her home. Lakshmi is furious, because her traditional values do not permit physical intimacy outside of marriage. In her fury, she bursts forward and drives Robbie away from the porch. Divya is furious at this kind of interference. She moves out of her parents' house and begins to cohabit (without marriage) with Robbie. Lakshmi is overwhelmed by this, and Prithvi is also angered, because he feels that Lakshmi has acted in haste and mishandled the situation. He begins to drift away from Lakshmi. Amid this storm, Lakshmi seeks a shoulder in an internet chat room, where she meets a "mitr" (Sanskrit: friend), with whom she is gradually able to share her thoughts and feelings. This connection yields another result: "mitr" points out that Lakshmi is too committed to her family to relax or be happy for herself. Lakshmi digests this and begins to explore her own interests in carpentry, dance, and hairstyling; she thereby establishes a new identity and personality for herself. She becomes fast friends with her new neighbors Steve (a computer security consultant) and his kid brother Paul.

Prithvi keeps his distance from these neighbors and all of Lakshmi's new friends. He is chagrined that the new Lakshmi is no longer his doting, traditional wife: she is still affectionate, but has now learned the notions of space and tacit distance. While he is inwardly glad she is growing, he discovers that there is depleting room for him, particularly at a time when he is coping with his daughter's absence. Things come to a head when he overhears Lakshmi laughing with Steve, assumes the worst, and uses a convenient work-related excuse to move out for a few days.

The film takes a turn when Lakshmi, now alone at home, receives a call from the hospital. Divya has broken up with Robbie and is now hurt. Divya realizes that she cannot cope with the vagaries and lack of commitment inherent in relationships with non-Indian people; she regrets her previous decisions and decides to return home. Mother and daughter spend some quality time and bond over Lakshmi"s narration of nostalgic stories about her arrival to a new life in the USA. She is in touch with her "mitr" all through.

The film builds to its climax when she asks, at Divya's urging, "mitr" to meet in person at the Fisherman's Wharf in San Francisco. All is revealed when "mitr" turns out to be none other than Prithvi himself.

Cast
 Shobhana as Lakshmi
 Nasser Abdullah as Prithvi
 Preeti Vissa as Divya
 Matt Phillips as Steve
 Blake Ormsby as Paul

Music
" Ehsaas" - Hariharan
"Give Me Hug" - ххSunitha Sarathyъъ
"Jaane Wafaa (Duet)" - Kavita Krishnamurthy, Sukhwinder Singh
"Jaane Wafaa (Male)" - Sukhwinder Singh
"Kuzhaloodhi" - Bombay Jayashri
"Mere Sapne" - Kavita Krishnamurthy
"Pyaar Chahiye" - Shaan
"Thom Tana" - Vasundhara Das

Awards
49th National Film Awards – 2001
 Best Feature Film in English – Suresh Menon
 Best Actress – Shobhana
 Best Editing – Beena Paul

International Film Festival of India
"Special Jury Award: Silver Peacock" at the 33rd International Film Festival of India.

References

External links

2002 films
English-language Indian films
Films featuring a Best Actress National Award-winning performance
Films scored by Bhavatharini
Films set in the United States
Films whose editor won the Best Film Editing National Award
Best English Feature Film National Film Award winners
Films scored by Ilaiyaraaja
2002 directorial debut films
Films directed by Revathi